Lumbia Airfield , formerly known as Lumbia Airport and Cagayan de Oro Airport, is an air base and was the main airport that served the general areas of Cagayan de Oro and Northern Mindanao, in the province of Misamis Oriental in the Philippines. It was the second busiest airport in Mindanao, after Francisco Bangoy International Airport in Davao City before the opening of Laguindingan International Airport.

It was classified as a Class 1 principal (major domestic) airport by the Civil Aviation Authority of the Philippines, a body of the Department of Transportation that is responsible for the operations airports in the Philippines (except major international ones).

Lumbia Airfield took its name from its location in Barangay Lumbia. It now serves as a minor air base of the Philippine Air Force, with service equipment of OV-10 Bronco aircraft as well as UH-1 Huey and MD-520MG Defender helicopters.

The new airport serves Northern Mindanao, as well as its major cities, Iligan and Cagayan de Oro.

History
Lumbia Airfield was opened in the 1930s during the American occupation of the Philippines. In World War II, the Japanese controlled the airstrip, with the runway being extended by the use of forced labor.

It remained as Cagayan de Oro's only airport, as the city grew in size and population. However, it came to the point where Lumbia airport could no longer keep up with CDO's rapid growth. Additionally, its higher elevation above the city meant that many flights had to divert during rain or thick fog.

At 22:00 (10:00pm) on Friday, June 14, 2013, the last passenger flight departed the former Lumbia Airport, signalling the end of a chapter in Philippine aviation history.  The IATA code CGY was transferred to Laguindingan Airport.

As a military air base 
It is now under control of the 10th Tactical Operations Group of the Philippine Air Force. The airport has been selected by the US military for building their facilities under the Enhanced Defense Cooperation Agreement.

In February 2017, the Philippine Air Force began relocating to the airport.

Accidents and incidents
 On February 2, 1998, Cebu Pacific Flight 387 from Ninoy Aquino International Airport in Manila to Cagayan de Oro, flown by a McDonnell Douglas DC-9, crashed into Mount Sumagaya in Claveria, Misamis Oriental, killing all 99 passengers and 5 crew on board. The cause of the crash was blamed on a number of factors: pilot error, an unusual flight route (due to an unscheduled stopover in Tacloban to deliver aircraft parts for another Cebu Pacific DC-9), bad weather, and incorrect air charts.

See also
Laguindingan International Airport

References

External links

Defunct airports in the Philippines
Buildings and structures in Cagayan de Oro
Air force installations of the Philippines